Alan Badenhorst (born 10 July 1970) is a South African cricketer. He played in 35 first-class and 12 List A matches from 1993/94 to 1998/99.

References

External links
 

1970 births
Living people
South African cricketers
Border cricketers
Eastern Province cricketers
Marylebone Cricket Club cricketers
Sportspeople from Cape Town